Benoît Georges de Najac (22 November 1748, Versailles - 26 November 1823, Paris) was a French nobleman, fleet commissioner, reformer and freemason. He became an écuyer (1781), and a comte de l’Empire (L.P. of 26 April 1808), as comte de Najac.

His descendants included the librettist and man of letters, Émile de Najac.

References

1748 births
1823 deaths
Counts of the First French Empire
People from Versailles